Chet Anderson Stadium is the stadium at Bemidji State University in Bemidji, Minnesota.  In 1939 a federal grant enabled Bemidji State to build new athletic facilities.

The first game held was against Concordia College, Moorhead on September 27, 1940.

Through various expansions of the years, the capacity currently sits at 5,000.

On October 5, 1996, the stadium was officially renamed in honor of Chester Anderson, head football coach from 1955 to 1965.

Sports venues in Minnesota
Bemidji State Beavers football
College football venues
Buildings and structures in Beltrami County, Minnesota